The Crossroads League (formerly the Mid-Central College Conference) is a college athletic conference affiliated with the National Association of Intercollegiate Athletics (NAIA). Its members are private Christian colleges in Indiana, Michigan, and Ohio. The current conference commissioner is Larry DeSimpelare.

History

In June 2012, the conference voted to change its name to the Crossroads League, a name to better reflect the conference having grown beyond its Central Indiana roots.

Chronological timeline
 1959 - On June 1, 1959, the Crossroad League was founded as the Mid-Central College Conference (MCCC). Charter members included Concordia Senior College, Grace College (now Grace College & Seminary), Huntington College, Indiana Institute of Technology (Indiana Tech) and Tri-State College (now Trine University), effective beginning the 1959–60 academic year.
 1963 - On September 17, 1963, the MCCC joined the National Association of Intercollegiate Athletics (NAIA) as a sponsored athletic conference.
 1966 - Saint Francis College (now the University of Saint Francis of Indiana) joined the MCCC, effective in the 1966–67 academic year.
 1969 - On Nov. 6, 1969, Goshen College joined the MCCC, effective beginning the 1970–71 academic year.
 1972 - Concordia Senior College left the MCCC, effective after the 1971–72 academic year.
 1973 - Marion College (now Indiana Wesleyan University) joined the MCCC, effective in the 1973–74 academic year.
 1978 - Indiana Tech left the MCCC, effective after the 1977–78 academic year.
 1979 - Grace left the MCCC, effective after the 1978–79 academic year.
 1980 - Tri-State announced that it would leave the MCCC on May 8, and Saint Francis (Ind.) announced the same on May 12, both effective after the 1980–81 academic year.
 1980 - On November 5, 1980, Bethel College (now Bethel University) joined the MCCC, with Grace re-joining back as well, both effective beginning the 1981–82 academic year.
 1986 - Bethel initially withdrew from the MCCC, effective after the 1985–86 academic year. However on August 25, 1986, Bethel was re-instated into the conference, effective in the 1986–87 academic year.
 1986 - Women's sports were introduced in the MCCC, effective in the 1986–87 academic year.
 1987 - On September 14, 1987, Marian College (now Marian University) joined the MCCC, effective in the 1987–88 academic year.
 1994 - Taylor University joined the MCCC, with Saint Francis (Ind.) re-joining back, both effective beginning the 1994–95 academic year.
 2004 - Spring Arbor University joined the MCCC, effective in the 2004–05 academic year.
 2010 - On November 30, 2010, Mount Vernon Nazarene University joined the MCCC, effective in the 2010–11 academic year.
 2012 - On June 27, 2012, the MCCC was rebranded as the Crossroads League, effective in the 2012–13 academic year.

Member schools

Current members
The Crossroads League currently has ten full members; all are private schools:

Notes

Former members
The Crossroads had three former full members, all were private schools:

Notes

Membership timeline

Sports

Commissioners Cup

Each year, the member institution with the most points based on final rankings in each sport, is awarded the Commissioners Cup (formerly known as the All Sports Trophy). The current holder is Indiana Wesleyan University, which has won the last twelve cups in a row and holds the record for cups won, with eighteen.

Notable athletes

Stevimir Ercegovac (Taylor University) 4-time national shot put champ, Olympian
Steve Platt (Huntington University) Professional basketball player
Steve Smith (University of St. Francis) College Slam Dunk Champion
Eric Stults, (Bethel College) pitcher with the Los Angeles Dodgers
Justin Masterson (Bethel College), pitcher with the Boston Red Sox
Katie Sowers (Goshen College), first female and first openly gay coach to coach in a Super Bowl

References

External links

 
1959 establishments in Indiana
Sports leagues established in 1959